Paraclemensia acerifoliella, the maple leafcutter moth, is a moth of the family Incurvariidae. It is found from south-eastern Canada and the north-eastern United States, south to the tip of the Appalachian Mountains in western North Carolina and possibly north-western Georgia.

Description
The wingspan is 9–12 mm. Adults have metallic blue forewings with a black area at the wingtip. The head is orange or yellowish. They are on wing from April to June in one generation per year.

The larvae feed on the leaves of Acer and sometimes also Fagus, Quercus, Betula and huckleberry species. Older larvae cut two circular portions of a leaf and bind them together as a portable case. They have a brownish thorax, black head and translucent whitish abdomen. Larvae can be found from June to September. The species overwinters in the pupal stage on the ground inside the portable case.

Gallery

References

Moths described in 1854
Taxa named by Asa Fitch
Incurvariidae